Mariapolis may refer to:

Mariápolis, a municipality in São Paulo, Brazil
Mariapolis, Manitoba, an unincorporated community

See also
Mariópolis, a municipality in Paraná, Brazil